Fotini Epanomitis (born 23 July 1969 in Perth, Western Australia) is an Australian novelist. Her first novel, The Mule's Foal, won the 1994 Commonwealth Writers' Prize, best first book, South East Asia and South Pacific, and the 1992 Australian Vogel Award.

Early years
Epanomitis was born in 1969. Her parents migrated to Perth from Thessaloniki in northern Greece the same year. She grew up in Perth, except for one year on her grandparents' farm in Greece when she was twelve.

She graduated from Curtin University with a BA (Hons), and an MA in Literature. She went on to teach literature at various Australian universities

Works
The mule's foal, Allen & Unwin, 1993, 
Ta votania tēs Mirelas, Nea Synora, 1995, 
Mulino žrebe, Translator Nina Kokelj, Goga, 2001,

References

1969 births
20th-century Australian novelists
Australian people of Greek descent
Australian women novelists
Curtin University alumni
Writers from Perth, Western Australia
Living people
20th-century Australian women writers